Ruth Kyalisima (born 21 November 1955) is a Ugandan sprinter. She competed in the women's 400 metres hurdles at the 1984 Summer Olympics and in the women's 4 × 100 metres relay at the 1988 Summer Olympics.

References

External links
 

1955 births
Living people
Athletes (track and field) at the 1974 British Commonwealth Games
Athletes (track and field) at the 1984 Summer Olympics
Athletes (track and field) at the 1988 Summer Olympics
Ugandan female sprinters
Ugandan female hurdlers
Olympic athletes of Uganda
Athletes (track and field) at the 1982 Commonwealth Games
Commonwealth Games silver medallists for Uganda
African Games silver medalists for Uganda
African Games medalists in athletics (track and field)
Place of birth missing (living people)
Athletes (track and field) at the 1978 All-Africa Games
Commonwealth Games medallists in athletics
20th-century Ugandan women
21st-century Ugandan women
Medallists at the 1982 Commonwealth Games